Mehar Muhammad Aslam Bharwana is a Pakistani politician who served as Provincial Minister of Punjab for Cooperatives, in office from  13 September 2018 to 2 November 2020.  He was a member of the Provincial Assembly of the Punjab from August 2018 to May 2022.

Political career

He was elected to the Provincial Assembly of the Punjab as an independent candidate from Constituency PP-127 (Jhang-IV) in 2018 Pakistani general election.

He joined Pakistan Tehreek-e-Insaf (PTI) following his election.

On 12 September 2018, he was inducted into the provincial Punjab cabinet of Chief Minister Sardar Usman Buzdar. On 13 September 2018, he was appointed as Provincial Minister of Punjab for Cooperatives.

On 2 November 2020, he was removed from his post of Provincial Minister of Punjab for Cooperative. He de-seated due to vote against party policy for Chief Minister of Punjab election  on 16 April 2022.

References

Living people
Pakistan Tehreek-e-Insaf MPAs (Punjab)
Provincial ministers of Punjab
Year of birth missing (living people)